Ihor Sylantyev (Igor Igorevich Silantyev; born 3 January 1991) is a Ukrainian former professional footballer who played as a midfielder for FC Chornomorets Odessa in the Ukrainian Premier League.

Sylantyev is product of youth team systems of FC Chornomorets.

He was called up to play for the Ukraine national under-21 football team by trainer Pavlo Yakovenko to the Commonwealth Cup in 2012.

In 2013, he retired from professional football after four months doping disqualification.

References

External links
 

1991 births
Living people
Footballers from Odesa
Ukrainian footballers
FC Chornomorets Odesa players
FC Chornomorets-2 Odesa players
FC Zirka Kropyvnytskyi players
Ukrainian Premier League players
Association football midfielders